Gardayesh-e Baluchabad (also Romanized as Gardāyesh-e Balūchābād; also known as Balūchābād-e Gardāyesh) is a village in Fenderesk-e Jonubi Rural District, Fenderesk District, Ramian County, Golestan Province, Iran. At the 2006 census, its population was 3,418, in 725 families.

References 

Populated places in Ramian County